The province of Karabakh (also spelled Qarabagh) was a north-western province of the Safavid Iran, centered on the geographic region of Karabakh.

The governorship of Karabakh was generally held by a member of the Qajars, one of the Qizilbash tribes. It's highlands were controlled by the five Armenian melikdoms.

History 
These provinces were headed by the shah's governors-general, who were called beglarbegs, or at other times hakems. The main urban center of the province of Karabakh was the city of Ganja. The first Safavid governor of Karabakh (hakem) was Piri Beg Qajar, and was appointed as such in 1501. Shahverdi-Sultan, from the Ziyadoglu clan of the Qajar tribe, was appointed by Shah Tahmasp I (r. 1524-1576) in 1554.

Administration 
Under the Safavids, Karabakh was part of the mamalek ("state lands"), a form of the iqta' that had been used by the Buyid dynasty (934–1062). It was a type of prebendalism in which lands were given away as fiefs to tribal military forces, thus demonstrating the Safavids' reliance on them to protect the country. Due to its more exposed position as a frontier province, Qarabagh continued to remain mamalek land to maintain more security, in contrast to some other provinces which were transformed into khassa ("crown lands"). The Qizilbash chieftains were rewarded with mamalek land in exchange for their military alertness and for paying limited defined sum every year. The governorship of Karabakh was generally held by a member of the Qizilbash Qajar tribe.

The plains of Karabakh were dominated by nomadic Turkic tribes, who moved to the hillsides in search of suitable pastures throughout the summer. The highlands of Karabakh were dominated by Armenian meliks (princes), who had established five melikdoms (Dizak, Gulistan, Jraberd, Khachen) that ruled in Karabakh from the 16th-century to the 18th-century. These Armenian-ruled principalities, which upheld the notion of Armenian statehood, were used by the Safavids to fight the Ottoman Empire.

List of governors 
This is a list of the known figures who governed Karabakh or parts of it. Beglerbeg and hakem were administrative titles designating the governor.

References

Sources
 
 
 
 
  
 

Safavid Iran
History of the Republic of Artsakh
Provinces of the Safavid dynasty
Karabakh